Shyamdev Roy Chaudhari (Dada) is an Indian politician and former cabinet minister in Government of Uttar Pradesh. He was former member of Uttar Pradesh Legislative Assembly representing Varanasi South assembly seven times, from 1989 to 2017. He is also known as Dada in Varanasi.
He is one of the greatest Indian politicians of entire India.

References

Members of the Uttar Pradesh Legislative Assembly
Politicians from Varanasi
Living people
Bharatiya Janata Party politicians from Uttar Pradesh
1939 births